The Union of Reform Partisans, is a political party in Djibouti. It was formed in 2005 as an offshoot of the Front for the Restoration of Unity and Democracy (FRUD). Ibrahim Chehem Daoud is the President of the UPR.

The UPR participated in Djibouti's first regional and communal elections held on 10 and 31 March 2006, winning seats in the regions of Obock and Tadjourah.

In the February 2008 parliamentary election, the UPR was part of the governing Union for the Presidential Majority (Union pour la Majorité Présidentielle, UMP) coalition.

At the opening of an extraordinary congress of the ruling RPP on 4 March 2009, UPR President Ibrahim Chehem Daoud called for a constitutional amendment that would allow President Ismaïl Omar Guelleh to run for a third term in 2011.

Electoral history

National Assembly elections

References

Political parties in Djibouti
2005 establishments in Djibouti
Political parties established in 2005